San Cono refers to the following places in Italy:

San Cono, Sicily, comune, Province of Catania
San Cono (Cessaniti), frazione of Cessaniti comune, Province of Vibo Valentia
San Cono (Rometta), frazione of Rometta comune, Province of Messina
San Cono (Tripi), frazione of Tripi comune, Province of Messina

See also
 Saint Conus